Hans Bouman (born in 1951) is a Dutch visual artist working in painting, sculpture, etching and video. He settled in Paris in 1980.

Life and career 
Hans Bouman grew up in Haarlem, Netherlands, and earned his degrees at the Graphics School and at the Rietveld Academy  of Amsterdam in 1978.

After settling in Paris in 1980, he received the Painting Prize at the Salon de Montrouge in 1985, when he became a well-known and successful visual artist. Along the years, art critics Alin Avila, Gérard Barrière, Gérard-Georges Lemaire, as well as novelist Daniel Picouly wrote the prefaces to the catalogues of his one-man shows.

During his career, Bouman's works have grown in a series of interconnected cycles.
His hieratic heads carved in the thickness and density of the layers of paint recalled the Moai of Easter island, the African masks or the dramatic elongations of Expressionnism. « The magic of Bouman lies in the play on pictorial matter and his capacity to make a forceful figure emerge from it, both literally and figuratively" Henri-François Debailleux wrote at the time.

In a subsequent series, a whole pantheon of gods and goddesses was born from his imagination: Årantaleph, Olafdir, Kratikoff, Mandi Tan...

He has always used photography, for instance in a series dedicated to the bunkers stranded on the beaches of the North Sea. With the development of digital photography, he merged drawing, painting and etching with the many possibilities offered by new technologies.

Travelling has always been part and parcel of his artistic approach. During his stays in Bobo-Dioulasso in Burkina Faso and Foumban in Cameroon, together with local traditional bronze casters he created a series of bronze lost-wax sculptures.

In 2014, he created a monumental sculpture for the Par't Sino-français in Shunde near Canton, Guangdong, that marked the anniversary of the 50 years of diplomatic relationships between France and China.

When he was invited as an artist in residence by the ADEFC created by novelist Ya Ding in 2017 et 2018, Hans Bouman's work took on a new direction, inspired by the astounding landscapes of Guangxi and Hubei provinces.

Hans Bouman is also the author of experimental films (The meanders of black, A Dream based on Franz Kafka's short story) and video portraits of his artist friends: Painters in Longzhou, Christine Jean, Serge Plagnol, Fred Kleinberg, Zwy Milshtein, Bernard Ollier, Sophie Sainrapt, Albert Hirsch...

Hans Bouman also works in his new studio in the countryside in the Loiret, where his recent work is permeated by the natural elements that surround him.

One-man shows (selection) 
 2023 Family Affairs #8, Galerie Area, Paris, avec Margreet Bouman et Ronald Ruseler
 2022 Corps & Esprit III, IF-Grenier à sel, Châtillon-Coligny
 2022 Lignes de Mire, Galerie Area , Paris 
 2020 Nature du regard, IF-Grenier à sel, Châtillon-Coligny
 2018 Je peins, donc tu es, Orangerie du Sénat, galerie Area, Paris
 2015 Loin des images et du bruit, Galerie Univer / Colette Colla, Paris
 2014 Le Concours des torses, Galerie Vanuxem, Paris
 2012 Body and Soul II, Pink Gallery, Seoul, South Korea, 
 2012 Body and Soul I, Kunstdoc, Seoul, South Korea 
 2012 Corps et Esprit II, Espace Saint-Louis, Bar-le-Duc
 2011 Têtes à tête, La Serre, Saint-Étienne
 2010 En corps, La Réserve d'area, Paris
 2008 Têtes ardentes, La Réserve d'area, Paris, catalogue
 2008 Corps et esprit, Centre d'art contemporain Raymond Farbos, Mont-de-Marsan
 2007 Suaire de soi, La Réserve d'area, Paris
 2005 Labyrinthe, avec S. Galazzo, F. Haddad et S. Sainrapt, L'Entrepôt, Paris
 2004 10 ans de peinture, Galerie Le Confort des Étranges, Toulouse
 2001 Galerie Art Déco, Antananarivo
 2000 Galerie Koralewski, Paris
 1999 Galerie Simoncini, Luxembourg
 1997 Au pays Lobi avec Bertrand Rieger, espace Paul Ricard, Paris, 
 1997 Centre culturel Albert Camus, Antananarivo, Madagascar
 1996 Œuvres récentes, Studio Kostel, Paris, Œuvres sur papier, galerie Vanuxem, Paris, Parcours 1985/1996, galerie Kiron, Paris
 1995 Galerie Westlund, Stockholm, Galerie Vanuxem, Paris
 1993 Traits de caractère, Chapelle de l'hôtel de ville, Vesoul 
 1993 Galerie Nicole Buck, Strasbourg
 1993 Galerie Vanuxem, Paris
 1992 Galerie Simoncini, Luxembourg, 
 1992 Sculptures, galerie Koralewski, Paris
 1990 Studio Kostel, Paris
 1990 Galerie Vanuxem, Paris
 1990 Galerie La Cour 21, Nantes
 1987 Galleria M.R., Rome
 1987 Galerie Nicole Ferry, Paris
 1986 Galerie Flora, Espace Kiron, Paris
 1985 Galerie Jean-Claude David, Grenoble

Artist's books 
 2021 Family affairs #6, 3 paper works with M. Bouman & R. Ruseler
 2020 Haarlem en ik, leporello, collection Museum Haarlem
 2018 Le Corps derrière le corps, text by Gérard-Georges Lemaire, Piver publisher
 2018 CommeUn n°17, text by Daniel Picouly with A. Inumaru et N. Gaulier, Area Paris, Alin Avila publisher
 2016 CommeUn n° 7, text by Alain Pizerra with B. Guarrigues et B. Pingeot, Area Paris, Alin Avila publisher
 2014 Le Concours des torses, text by Gérard-Georges Lemaire, Piver publisher
 2013 Face-A-Face, a photographic dialogue in South Korea, Piver publisher
 2012 Body & Soul, Paris & Seoul,Piver publisher
 2005 Sextus, text by Gérard-Georges Lemaire, Area Paris publisher
 1998 From Bobo to Ouaga, text by Hans Bouman & Tony Soulié, Yeo publisher for Area Paris
 1998 Family Affairs, with M. Bouman & R. Ruseler, text by I. Lanz & D. Cunin, M.Bouman publisher
 1997 Chemins croisés en Pays Lobi, texts by G. Barrière, C. Barbier, H. Bouman, M.-C. Guyot, F. Le Graverend & B. Rieger, Espace Paul Ricard & Polaroid
 1996 Voici moi, poem by Tadeusz Koralewski, illustrated by Hans Bouman, Area Paris, Alin Avila publisher
 1993 Têtes, a drawing notebook, Yeo for Area Paris, Alin Avila publisher
 1993 Visages, text by Gérard Barrière, galerie Vanuxem publisher, Paris

Collections 
 Guangzhou FengLe Medical Technology Co, Guangzhou, Guangdong, Chine
 Museum Haarlem, Haarlem, Pays-Bas
 International Art Centre, Shangjin, Hubei, Chine
 International Museum, Longzhou, Guangxi, Chine
 P’art sino-français, Shunde, Guangdong, Chine
 BNP Paribas, Paris
 Ars Aevi, Museum of Contemporary Art, Sarajevo, Bosnia and Herzegovina
 Musée de Toulon, donation Alin Avila

Articles (sélection) 
 Gérard-Georges Lemaire, Dans l'atelier de Hans Bouman, Verso-hebdo, 2021
 Vitorio E. Pisu, Hans Bouman. Nature du regard, Palazzi a Venezia n° 9, septembre 2020
 Alin Avila, Je peins, donc tu es, area revue n° 34, printemps 2018
 Hassouna Mosbahi, Un peintre hollandais à Paris, elaph.com, 30 mars 2017
 Gérard-Georges Lemaire, Body and Soul, Culture Ocean, mars-avril 2013
 Chistophe Averty, Les âmes silencieuses, Artension n° 112, 2013
 Gérard Férou, L’Afrique fantôme d'Hans Bouman, Les Lettres françaises, octobre 2007
 Gérard-Georges Lemaire, Hans Bouman , Santé mentale, no 167, 2012
 Henri-François Debailleux, Hans Bouman en têtes, Libération, 29 novembre 1996
 Françoise Monnin, Le double visage d'Hans Bouman, Muséart, no 55, novembre 1995

Bibliography 
 Gérard-Georges Lemaire, Le Noir absolu et les Leçons de ténèbres, Hémisud, 2009
 Daniel Picouly et Gérard-Georges Lemaire, Têtes ardentes, Éditions Area, 2008
 Gérard-Georges Lemaire, Labyrinthe, 2004
 Alin Avila, Totems de silence: Hans Bouman, 1996, Yeo éditeur pour Area, Paris (EAN 265–0006469745)
 Gérard Barrière, Traits de caractères, 1993
 Henri-François Debailleux, Hans Bouman, Galerie Vanuxem éditeur, Paris, 1990
 Gérard Barrière, Hans le tenace, Paris, 1987
 Henri-François Debailleux et Gérard-Georges Lemaire, Hans Bouman, Grenoble, 1985
 Alin Avila, L'Éloge de la peinture,

References

External links
 www.hansbouman.com

1951 births
Living people
Dutch artists